Bohinjska Bistrica railway station is the principal railway station in Bohinjska Bistrica, Slovenia.

External links 
Official site of the Slovenian railways

Railway stations in Slovenia